Reece Tapine (born 9 April 1999) is an Australian rugby union player who plays for the  in Super Rugby. His playing position is centre or wing. He was named in the Force squad for the 2022 Super Rugby Pacific season.

Reference list

External links
itsrugby.co.uk profile

1999 births
Australian rugby union players
Living people
Rugby union centres
Rugby union wings
ACT Brumbies players
Western Force players
People from Gosford
Rugby union players from New South Wales